The Khan Solar Power Station, is a  solar power plant under construction in Namibia. The project is owned and under development by Access Aussenkehr Solar One Namibia a Namibian independent power producer (IPP), based in Windhoek, the country's capital city. The energy generated here will be purchased by NamPower, the national electricity utility company, which is wholly owned by the government of Namibia. A 25-year power purchase agreement (PPA), governs the terms under which the energy will be sold and bought.

Location

Overview
The solar farm is designed to comprise 33,000 ground-mounted solar panels, 100 inverters and related hardware. The solar panels are mounted on 67 single-axis trackers which tilt the attached panels to track the direction of the sun, thereby maximizing exposure and electricity generated. The 20 megawatts generated at this power station will be purchased by NamPower for integration into the national electricity grid.

The NamPower Khan High Voltage Substation near Usakos, lies adjacent to this solar farm and the farm's output will be directed to that substation for energy evacuation.

Construction, costs and timeline
The cost of construction was reported as 300 Namibian dollars (US$21 million). Construction began in March 2022, with  commercial commissioning anticipated in the fourth quarter of 2022. The owner/developer of this power station selected HopSol, based in Windhoek, Namibia, as the engineering, procurement and construction (EPC) contractor.

Other considerations
The PPA between the parties stipulates a contract price of US$0.495 per kiloWatt hour, which is lower than the cost of power derived from fossil-fuel sources. Therefore this solar farm will contribute to reduction of the cost of electricity in Namibia.

See also

List of power stations in Namibia
Mariental Solar Power Station
Kokerboom Solar Power Station

References

External links
  Nampower Khan Substation Solar PV Park, Namibia As of 9 February 2022.

Solar power stations in Namibia
Buildings and structures in Erongo Region